Bill Lordan (born May 22, 1947 in Minneapolis, Minnesota), is an American rock music drummer who has been in a number of bands, such as The Mystics, Gypsy, Robin Trower Band and Sly & The Family Stone.  He began playing in sixth grade when his teacher offered after-school lessons.

Career
Lordan started his recording career with The Amazers, The Mystics, The Esquires and Gypsy, a progressive rock band from Minnesota, recording three albums with them from 1971 to 1973. He also recorded with Bobby Womack and Ike and Tina Turner.  He then joined Sly & The Family Stone. By 1974, Sly & The Family Stone released the album Small Talk. Along with violinist Sid Page,  The first drummer for Sly & The Family Stone was Greg Errico who was succeeded on the album Fresh by Andy Newmark.

In late 1974, Lordan joined Robin Trower's band debuting on the album For Earth Below. He stayed with Trower until late 1987, his last recording during his stint being the B.L.T. album with Jack Bruce.  In 1980 he endorsed The Zildjian Company and was included in the Zildjian Cymbal Set Up Book of famous drummers. He also endorsed Rogers and DW Drum Companies and Remo and Aquarian Companies. He played with the Darrell Mansfield Band, the Dave Steffen Band and The Chris Aaron Band before starting his own band, The Bill Lordan Experiment, in 2000.

Personal life
Bill is married to Diana Olson, a freelance entertainment writer.

Discography

 1964 The Amazers:  It's You For Me
 1967 The Esquires: Get on Up
 1968 The Mystics: Pain
 1971 Gypsy: In the Garden
 1972 Gypsy: Antithesis
 1973 Gypsy: Unlock the Gates
 1974 Sly and the Family Stone: Small Talk
 1975 Robin Trower: For Earth Below
 1975 Ike & Tina Turner: Sexy Ida
 1975 Bobby Womack: I Don't Know What the World Is Coming To
 1975 Robin Trower: BBC Radio 1: Live in Concert
 1976 Robin Trower: Long Misty Days
 1975 Robin Trower: Live
 1977 Robin Trower: In City Dreams
 1978 Robin Trower: Caravan to Midnight
 1980 Robin Trower: Victims of the Fury
 1981 Robin Trower & Jack Bruce: B.L.T.
 1983 Darrell Mansfield Band: The Vision
 1990 Spellbinder
 1990 Dave Steffen Band: Blues Cruise Live
 1993 Dave Steffen Band: Give Me A Thril
 1994 The Bill Lordan Drum Beat Instruction Video (DVD)
 1996 Robin Trower: King Biscuit Flower Hour (In Concert)
 1997 Dave Steffen Band: Flying Potion
 2000 Charlie Souza: Live Your Dream
 2000 Bill Lordan Experiment: BLX Live at the Coach House
 2001 Charlie Souza: 9 Ball In The Corner Pocket
 2001 Bill Lordan Experiment: Emotional Blackmail
 2003 Talkin' To Angels
 2003 Calvin James: It Ain't Over
 2003 Bill Lordan Experiment: Here Comes The Storm
 2004 Chris Aaron Band: 5 Miles to Freedom
 2004 Lordan/Serrato:  Eyes of a Woman
 2004 Bill Lordan Experiment: The Best of BLX
 2014 Bill Lordan Experiment: The NEW Best of BLX
 2015 Bill Lordan Experiment: The Best of BLX II
 2015 The Bill Lordan History CD
 2015 The Robin Trower Band Live at the Paramount Theater, Seattle, WA.CD 3/7/75
 2015 The Robin Trower Band Victims of the Fury Tour Live CD 
 2016 Bill Lordan Experiment: The Best of BLX III
 2016 The Robin Trower DVD of TV Shows and Concerts
 2016 The Robin Trower Band Live at New Georges, San Rafael, CA. 4/5/87
 2016 The Robin Trower Band Live at Winterland, San Francisco, CA 3/15/75
 2016 The Robin Trower Band Live The BBC Recordings
 2016 The Robin Trower Band Live The Long Misty Days Tour CD
 2016 The Robin Trower Band Live For Earth Below Tour CD
 2016 The Robin Trower Band Live at Leeds University, England 2/15/75
 2016 The Robin Trower Band Live at Madison Square Garden, NY 3/24/76
 2017 The Robin Trower Band The Best of In City Dreams CD
 2017 The Robin Trower Band Bridge of Sighs Tour CD
 2017 The Robin Trower Band Live at City Hall, Newcastle, England CD
 2017 The Robin Trower Band live in Gothenburg, Sweden 2/75
 2017 Faith
 2017 Feel The Spirit
 2017 Gypsy Live at the St. Paul Winter Carnival 1973
 2017 Gypsy Live at Armstrong High School, Minneapolis 1971
 2017 The Robin Trower Band Long Misty Days Recording Sessions
 2017 The Robin Trower Band Caravan To Midnight Recording Sessions
 2017 The Best of The Dave Steffen Band
 2019 A self published book of Bill Lordan's musical journey 'From The Basement To The Coliseum - The Story of Drummer Bill Lordan.  Written by Bill Lordan and Diana Olson

References

1947 births
Living people
Place of birth missing (living people)
American rock musicians
American rock drummers
20th-century American drummers
American male drummers
Gypsy (band) members
20th-century American male musicians